Michael Joseph Alvin Bast (born 6 January 1953) is a former speedway rider from the United States.

Speedway career 
Bast is a seven times North American champion, winning the AMA National Speedway Championship in 1971, 1973, 1975, 1976, 1977, 1978 and 1979.

Family
His older brother Steve Bast was also a North American speedway champion and his cousin Bart Bast was a US Champion.

References 

1953 births
Living people
American speedway riders
Motorcycle racers from Los Angeles